The 2004 Mid-American Conference baseball tournament took place in May 2004. The top six regular season finishers met in the double-elimination tournament held at Bill Theunissen Stadium on the campus of Central Michigan University in Mount Pleasant, Michigan. This was the sixteenth Mid-American Conference postseason tournament to determine a champion. Fourth seed  won their fifth tournament championship to earn the conference's automatic bid to the 2004 NCAA Division I baseball tournament.

Seeding and format 
The winner of each division claimed the top two seeds, while the next four finishers based on conference winning percentage only, regardless of division, participated in the tournament. The teams played double-elimination tournament. This was the seventh year of the six team tournament.

Results

All-Tournament Team 
The following players were named to the All-Tournament Team.

Most Valuable Player 
Ryan Ford and Andy Sonnanstine were named co-Most Valuable Players. Ford played for Eastern Michigan while Sonnanstine was a pitcher for Kent State.

References 

Tournament
Mid-American Conference Baseball Tournament
Mid-American Conference baseball tournament
Mid-American Conference baseball tournament